Robert, Bob or Bobby Drake may refer to:

Bob Drake (musician) (born 1957), musician and recording engineer
Bobby Drake, drummer for the American rock band The Hold Steady
Bob Drake (racing driver) (1919–1990), American racing driver
Iceman (Marvel Comics), alias Robert "Bobby" Drake, Marvel Comics character
Robert E. Drake (1923–2006), American intelligence official
Robert Drake (editor) (born 1962 or 1963), gay American author and editor
Robert Drake (MP) for Marlborough